In mathematics, Kuratowski convergence or Painlevé-Kuratowski convergence is a notion of convergence for subsets of a topological space. First introduced by Paul Painlevé in lectures on mathematical analysis in 1902, the concept was popularized in texts by Felix Hausdorff and Kazimierz Kuratowski.  Intuitively, the Kuratowski limit of a sequence of sets is where the sets "accumulate".

Definitions
The Kuratowski limits inferior and superior generalize this intuition of limit and cluster points to subsets of the given space .

Metric Spaces 

Let  be a metric space, where  is a given set. For any point  and any non-empty subset , define the distance between the point and the subset:

Topological Spaces 

Examples

Then the sequence  defined by  has .
If , then  while .
 Let . Then  converges in the Kuratowski sense to the entire line.
 In a topological vector space, if  is a sequence of cones, then so are the Kuratowski limits superior and inferior.

Properties

The following properties hold for the limits inferior and superior in both the metric and topological contexts, but are stated in the metric formulation for ease of reading.
 If  is a constant sequence, then .
 If  is a sequence of singletons, then  and  consist of the limit points and cluster points, respectively, of the sequence .
 (Hit and miss criteria) For a closed subset , one has
 , if and only if for every open set  with  there exists  such that  for all ,
 , if and only if for every compact set  with  there exists  such that  for all .
If  denotes Hausdorff metric, then  implies . However, noncompact closed sets may converge in the sense of Kuratowski while  for each 
Convergence in the sense of Kuratowski is weaker than convergence in the sense of Vietoris but equivalent to convergence in the sense of Fell. If  is compact, then these are all equivalent and agree with convergence in Hausdorff metric.

Kuratowski Continuity of Set-Valued Functions 
Denote . We can define the operatorswhere  means convergence in sequences when  is metrizable and convergence in nets otherwise. Then,

  is inner semi-continuous at  if ;
  is outer semi-continuous at  if .

Continuity of set-valued functions is commonly defined in terms of lower- and upper-hemicontinuity popularized by Berge. For set-valued functions with closed values, continuity in the sense of Vietoris-Berge is stronger than continuity in the sense of Kuratowski.

Examples 

 The set-valued function  is continuous .

Properties 

  is (globally) outer semi-continuous, if and only if its graph  is closed.
 (Relations to Vietoris-Berge continuity). Suppose  is closed.
The converse is false in general, but holds when  is a compact space.
Conversely, given any inner semi-continuous set-valued function , the convex hull mapping  is also inner semi-continuous.

Epi-convergence and Γ-convergence

Similarly, since , it follows that  uniformly.

When  is a topological space, epi-convergence of the sequence  is called Γ-convergence. From the perspective of Kuratowski convergence there is no distinction between epi-limits and Γ-limits.

See also
 Set-theoretic limit
 Borel–Cantelli lemma, but note that set-theoretic limits and Kuratowski limits do not agree.
 Wijsman convergence
 Hausdorff distance
 Hemicontinuity
 Vietoris topology
 Epi-convergence
 Gamma convergence

Notes

References

 

  

 

Metric geometry